Fowling is a hybrid game that combines the equipment of American football and bowling into one sport with a similar layout as horseshoes and cornhole. Most commonly played as a pastime in a tailgate or campground setting across the United States, Fowling was founded in 2001 by Chris Hutt and a bunch of friends from Detroit, Michigan, tailgating at the Indy 500. The object of Fowling is for teams to be the first to knock down all opponent's pins by throwing a full-size regulation football at 10 bowling pins positioned in a traditional bowling layout.

Rules 
The American Fowling Association (AFA) has established a set of guidelines in order to govern sanctioned tournament play. All AFA members are expected to comply with the rules and regulations established and any violations or offenses will result in a team forfeiture at the discretion of a judge or official. Players have the option to protest a ruling to an official if they feel a violation has occurred by the opposing team.

Gameplay 
Fowling is played one-on-one, in teams of two, or with doubles play where teams stand on opposite ends called lanes. In doubles play, teammates are positioned on the same lane and throw at the opposing team's lane. Similar to football, the game starts with a coin toss where the winner is granted the decision whether to fowl first or choose a lane to defend and defer to the other team to decide on fowling first. Each team alternates throwing the football at their opponent's pins while also alternating fowlers within the team. Each player has 20 seconds to throw starting from their intention on throwing. An imaginary foul line is designated for men and women who are throwing. Men are allowed to throw anywhere behind the back edge of the lane and women may throw from anywhere behind the front edge of the lane. Players may use any throwing style but must throw from the same location during each frame and must throw with the same arm for an entire match unless a medical emergency permits otherwise. At no time are players allowed to interfere with the throwing of the football or the ball contacting the pins. Defense is authorized only when a ball has crossed the foul line and technically still in play until it stops. Any rule violation results in a foul throw for the other team and regains possession as well regardless of throwing rotation predicted by the coin toss.

Like bowling, each match is broken down into frames. In match play, one frame is completed when all pins are knocked down on either lane. The team that accomplishes this first wins the frame. The game is over when a team wins two out of three frames. A tie occurs when the team that throws last knocks down all the other team's pins. In the case of a tie, overtime is invoked in a sudden death contest to determine the winner. Both teams place one pin anywhere on the fowling lane for their opponent's to throw at. A coin toss determines who throws first and no equalizer throw is allowed. The team that knocks their opponent's pin down first wins the match.

Layout and equipment 
Fowling matches are played with two wooden platforms, 20 bowling pins and a regulation-size football.

The lane surface shall be a  rectangle constructed of half-inch plywood fastened to a 2-inch × 4-inch wood frame edge. For ease of transportation, lanes made of two  plywood boards may also be used as long as they are correctly fastened together during tournament play. AFA-sanctioned tournaments should only be played on wooden fowling lanes due to significant variance in play for different surface materials. It is recommended that adjacent lanes be spaced at least 15 feet apart from each other.

Bowling pins should be standard regulation size and weight and arrange in the standard, triangular bowling pin formation with equidistant 12-inch spacing between each pin from center to center (see diagram below).

Footballs must meet pro or college regulation size and weight standards for tournament play. Footballs should also be inflated to regulation pressure to avoid deflategate situations.

See also 
 Cornhole
 Horseshoes
 Ladder toss
 Washer pitching
 Lawn game

References

External links
 American Fowling Association
 The Fowling Warehouse

Lawn games
Sports originating in the United States
Competitions
Throwing games